The 1920–21 season was Maccabi Tel Aviv's 15th season since its establishment, in 1906. As the local football association wasn't founded until July 1928, there were no officially organized competitions during the season, and the club played only friendly matches.

Overview
Following its occupation by British troops in 1917–1918, Palestine was governed by the Occupied Enemy Territory Administration. In July 1920, the military administration was replaced by a civilian administration headed by a High Commissioner, allowing civil life to resume following the aftermath of The Great War. Maccabi societies resumed activities in several cities and settlements, including in  Tel Aviv.

Known Matches

As no governing body existed at the time, and with limited possibilities for travel, the football sections of the Jerusalem and Tel Aviv societies played matches, mostly against teams of British soldiers stationed in the vicinity, played mostly between January and March 1921. Following the Jaffa riots in May 1921, footballing activity stopped, except for one match, played on 25 May 1921.

Squad
List of players for the match against Maccabi Jerusalem, 16 April 1921:

Kurtzmann; Milo Shmurk, Yosef Vilenchik; Abie Wilson, Baruch Kushnir, Grinfeld ; Shimon Ratner (Limek), Eliezer Polani, Katsav, Tiumkin, Ephraim Rubinstein

References

Maccabi Tel Aviv F.C. seasons
Maccabi Tel Aviv